The Ödemiş station is one of two railway stations in Ödemiş. The Turkish State Railways operates six (seven on weekends) daily trains to and from Basmane station in İzmir. The station was built in 1884 by the Ottoman Railway Company and is the older of the two railway stations in the town.

Service

References

Railway stations opened in 1884
Railway stations in İzmir Province
1884 establishments in the Ottoman Empire
Ödemiş District